2009–10 Eerste Klasse was a Dutch association football season of the Eerste Klasse.

Saturday champions were:
 A: VV Young Boys
 B: Voorschoten '97
 C: VV Heerjansdam
 D: SVZW Wierden
 E: Oranje Nassau Groningen

Sunday champions were:
 A: VV De Zouaven
 B: VV Nieuwenhoorn
 C: VV Dongen (through finals)
 D: SV Deurne
 E: VV Rigtersbleek
 F: Friesche Voetbal Club

Eerste Klasse seasons
4